KMGW (99.3 FM) is a radio station broadcasting a classic hits format. Licensed to Naches, Washington, United States, the station is currently owned by Townsquare Media.

History

The station signed on as KREW-FM in 1999, before changing its call letters to KQSN in 2002. By that year, 99.3 had a classic hits format as "99.3 The Hawk". In 2006, KQSN flipped to Spanish Oldies, as "La Preciosa". On April 2, 2008, after Clear Channel sold the station to GapWest Broadcasting, KQSN flipped to adult hits as "My 99.3". Prior to this, KQSN had been simulcasting KDBL after the sale closed three months earlier. 
On November 17, 2011, KQMY changed their format to news/talk, simulcasting KIT 1280 AM.

On February 17, 2012, KQMY changed their call letters to KIT-FM.

On September 18, 2015, 99.3 flipped to rhythmic oldies as "Mega 99.3" with a callsign change to KMGW. KMGW was also Yakima's affiliate for Slow Jams with R. Dub, which previously aired on KFFM-107.3 (Yakima only gets the Sunday night version on KFFM-107.3 as of 2019.)

On February 1, 2019, the rhythmic oldies format was replaced by a classic hits format known as 'MegaHits,' most likely designed to compete against their Radio Yakima competitor KARY-FM.

Previous logo

References

External links

MGW (FM)
Radio stations established in 2000
Townsquare Media radio stations
Classic hits radio stations in the United States